Marlwood School (founded 1606) is a state-funded secondary school currently part of the CSET academy chain. Located at Alveston, South Gloucestershire, it is situated on the B3561 on the outskirts of the south-west of the village.

Marlwood School has around 500 pupils aged 11–16.

In its most recent Ofsted inspection, Marlwood was rated ‘Requires Improvement’ overall and ‘Good’ in 3 out of 4 measures, with the report noting that the school ‘is enjoying a new lease of life.’

History

Grammar school
The school was founded in 1606 as Thornbury Free School. In the following centuries, it was housed in a number of buildings throughout Thornbury. In 1879 the school merged with Attwell’s Free School to become Thornbury Grammar School, moving to buildings on Gloucester Road.

Comprehensive
Thornbury Grammar School was relocated to new buildings on the outskirts of neighbouring Alveston in 1972 where it received its first comprehensive intake and was renamed Marlwood School under the headship of Terry Fazey.

Academy
Marlwood School converted to academy status on 1 November 2014 and is now independent of local authority control. However, the school continues to coordinate with South Gloucestershire Council for admissions. The school is now part of the education trust CSET (Castle School Education Trust).

It was formerly a Beacon school and had attained the status of Science College, due to excellence at science.

Sixth form provision is shared with The Castle School and based in the old Thornbury Grammar School buildings.

News about the school is shared fortnightly through the Marlwood School Bulletin.

Notable alumni 

 Tony Britton – Actor
Sally Conway – Olympic medalist judoka
Paul Nicholls – Champion National Hunt Trainer
Miles Normandale – Rugby player 
 Rhys Oakley – Welsh rugby player
John Pullin – England rugby captain

Media
Marlwood School featured in the BBC Two series, School in November 2018. The head explained the impossible nature of improving a school, with declining numbers, a poor Ofsted judgement and annual cuts to an inadequate budget. He was filmed writing his resignation letter. This act was received favourably and with sympathy by fellow headteachers.

See also
The Castle School

References

Histories

External links
 Official website
Thornbury Grammar School historical website

Secondary schools in South Gloucestershire District
1606 establishments in England
Educational institutions established in the 1600s
Academies in South Gloucestershire District